Xanthocrambus saxonellus is a species of moth in the family Crambidae described by Johann Leopold Theodor Friedrich Zincken in 1821. It is found in France, Belgium, Germany, Switzerland, Austria, Slovenia, Italy, the Czech Republic, Slovakia, Hungary, Romania, Bulgaria, Croatia, Bosnia and Herzegovina, North Macedonia, Albania, Greece, Belarus, Turkmenistan, Asia Minor, Transcaucasia, Armenia and China.

The wingspan is 19–23 mm. Adults are on wing from mid-May to August.

The larvae feed on Gramineae species.

References

Moths described in 1821
Crambinae
Moths of Europe
Moths of Asia